Pristimantis uisae is a species of frog in the family Strabomantidae.

It is endemic to Colombia.
Its natural habitat is tropical moist montane forests.
It is threatened by habitat loss.

References

uisae
Endemic fauna of Colombia
Amphibians of Colombia
Amphibians of the Andes
Frogs of South America
Amphibians described in 2003
Taxonomy articles created by Polbot